Issia is a town in western Ivory Coast. It is a sub-prefecture of and the seat of Issia Department in Haut-Sassandra Region, Sassandra-Marahoué District. Issia is also a commune.

In 2021, the population of the sub-prefecture of Issia was 126,252.

Villages
The 32 villages of the sub-prefecture of Issia and their population in 2014 are:

Notes

Sub-prefectures of Haut-Sassandra
Communes of Haut-Sassandra